Oenomaus melleus is a species of butterfly of the family Lycaenidae. It is found in wet lowland forests in Nicaragua, Costa Rica, French Guiana, Guyana, Venezuela, Colombia, Peru, Bolivia and Brazil.

References

Butterflies described in 1907
Eumaeini